Camaldine Abraw (born 15 August 1990) is a Togolese footballer who plays for French club Football Club de l'Ouest Tourangeau 37.

Career
Born in Lomé, Abraw began his career 2004 with Académie Delta Liberty. In 2008 he joined French club LB Châteauroux and played the 2008–09 season with the youth team. In the 2009–10 season he was promoted to the reserve team and made his professional debut for Châteauroux in the Ligue 2 on 2 April 2010 against Dijon. On 28 May 2010, he signed his first professional contract with Châteauroux over three years.

In August 2013, Abraw moved to Free State Stars in the South African Premier Soccer League, signing a two-year contract with the option of a further year.

On 6 February 2019, Abraw signed with Tercera División side Caudal Deportivo. After seven games for the club, Caudal announced on their official Twitter profile, that Abraw had left the club due to personal reasons.

International career
Abraw is former member of the Togo national under-17 football team, played the 2007 FIFA U-17 World Cup in South Korea and the African U-17 Cup. He made his senior debut for the Togo national football team on 13 May 2010 against Gabon national football team.

Personal life
Camaldine is the son of former Togolese footballer and manager Samer Abraw.

References

External links
 
 

1990 births
Sportspeople from Lomé
Living people
Togolese footballers
Togo international footballers
Togo youth international footballers
Association football forwards
Ligue 2 players
South African Premier Division players
Liga I players
UAE First Division League players
Championnat National players
Championnat National 2 players
Championnat National 3 players
LB Châteauroux players
Les Herbiers VF players
AS Cherbourg Football players
Free State Stars F.C. players
Kaizer Chiefs F.C. players
ACS Poli Timișoara players
AmaZulu F.C. players
Al Dhaid SC players
Caudal Deportivo footballers
Togolese expatriate footballers
Expatriate footballers in France
Expatriate soccer players in South Africa
Expatriate footballers in Romania
Expatriate footballers in the United Arab Emirates
Expatriate footballers in Spain
Togolese expatriate sportspeople in France
Togolese expatriate sportspeople in South Africa
Togolese expatriate sportspeople in Romania
Togolese expatriate sportspeople in Spain
21st-century Togolese people